Marmat is a tehsil in the Doda district of Jammu and Kashmir, India. Marmat consists of 18 villages, including the village of Marmat. It is 45 kilometres south of the district headquarters of Doda.

Demographics
According to the census of 2011, Marmat has a population of 28,501 (14,632 males and 13,869 females). The sex ratio is 992 females per 1,000 males. The sex ratio among scheduled tribes exceeds the rural district-wide sex ratio of 929 females per 1,000 males by as many as four blocks.

Local Wildlife

Himalayan Black Bear (Selenarctos thibetanus)  
While the Himalayan Black Bear was quite common in Marmat, its population has experienced a sharp decline due to poaching. These bears are now found in the interiors of the steep forest areas of the Marmat ranges, though few are believed to remain alive.

Common Langur (Presbytis entellus) 
Locally known as langur, these animals are frequently found in the forests of Marmat. They inhabit altitudes up to 3,500 meters above mean sea level. In general, they are more arboreal in habitat than macaques. They occasionally pillage gardens and cultivated areas. Langurs live in reasonably large groups of all ages and both sexes.

Koklass Pheasant (Ceriornis macrolophus) 
The Koklass Pheasant is a species of bird that can be found in Doda, between the Batote and Marmat ranges.

Villages in Marmat
 GOHA 
 PRABAL
 BARI
 Gangalwar
 Hambal
 Hud
 Kalaya
 Khalleni
 Mangota
 Malhori
 Mothi
 Behota
 Paryote
 Roat
 Sarak
 Saras
 Sarsi
 Seote

Disasters and tragedies
On 12 November 2019, at least 16 people killed in a road accident near Khellani village of Marmat tehsil.

Another incident happened on 20 August 2002 where entire village panchayat Mangota A and B were burnt by Army.

References

Villages in Doda district